Troubling the Line: Trans and Genderqueer Poetry and Poetics a collection of poetry by transgender and genderqueer writers, edited by TC Tolbert and Trace Peterson. The collection itself contains some of the works by 55 different poets along with a "poetics statement", a reflection by each poet that provides context for their work. The book was published in 2013 by Nightboat Books. The collection was reviewed by Stephanie Burt on Poetry Foundation's website. It has been called "the first-ever collection of poetry by trans and genderqueer poets." An earlier anthology, “Of Souls and Roles, Of Sex and Gender," was compiled by trans activist Rupert Raj between 1982 and 1991, but remains available only in manuscript form at The ArQuives: Canada's LGBQT2+ Archives and at the Transgender Archives, University of Victoria.

Awards 
The collection was a finalist for the Lambda Award in LGBT Anthology (2014).

Contributing Poets 

 Ahimsa Timoteo Bodhrán,
 Amir Rabiyah
 Ari Banias
 Ariel Goldberg
 Bo Luengsuraswat
 CAConrad
 Ching-In Chen
 Cole Krawitz
 D'Lo
 David Wolach
 Dawn Lundy Martin
 Drew Krewer
 Duriel E. Harris
 EC Crandall
 Eileen Myles
 Eli Clare
 Ely Shipley
 Emerson Whitney
 Fabian Romero
 Gr Keer
 HR Hegnauer
 J. Rice
 j/j hastain
 Jaime Shearn Coan
 Jake Pam Dick
 Jen (Jay) Besemer
 Jenny Johnson
 John Wieners
 Joy Ladin
 Julia Talamantez Brolaski
 kari edwards
 Kit Yan
 Laura Neuman
 Lilith Latini
 Lizz Bronson
 Lori Selke
 Max Wolf Valerio
 Meg Day
 Micha Cárdenas
 Monica / Nico Peck
 Natro
 Oliver Bendorf
 Reba Overkill
 Samuel Ace
 Stacey Waite
 Stephanie Burt
 TC Tolbert
 Tim Trace Peterson
 Trish Salah
 TT Jax
 Y. Madrone
 Yosmay del Mazo
 Zoe Tuck

References

External links 

 http://www.tctolbert.com/
 http://www.nightboat.org/title/troubling-line-trans-and-genderqueer-poetry-and-poetics

Poetry anthologies
Transgender literature
2010s LGBT literature
LGBT poetry
2013 poetry books